WHJD (920 AM) is a radio station licensed to Hazlehurst, Georgia, United States. The station is owned by Broadcast South, LLC.

References

External links

HJD